Macaduma macrosema is a moth of the subfamily Arctiinae. It was described by George Hampson in 1914. It is found in Papua New Guinea.

References

Macaduma
Moths described in 1914